Hoenig v Isaacs [1952] EWCA Civ 6 is an English contract law case, concerning substantial performance of an entire obligation.

Facts
Mr Isaacs was contracted to decorate and furnish Mr Hoenig's' flat for £750. When the work was done, there were problems with a bookcase and wardrobe, which would cost £55 to fix. Mr Hoenig refused to pay the £350 outstanding.

Judgment
Somervell LJ upheld the decision of an Official Referee at first instance, His Honour Sir Lionel Leach, in finding there had been substantial compliance.  He noted each case turns on the construction of the contract. Where there is substantial performance of the contract, then money must be paid. The work was done, and then there was merely a damages claim in respect of the faulty parts.  He noted the case was near the border line for substantial performance and disallowed the appeal.

Denning LJ also disallowed the appeal and gave judgment as follows.

See also
Jacob & Youngs v. Kent, 230 N.Y. 239 (1921) the possible inspiration, and judgment by Cardozo J in New York
Cutter v Powell (1795) 101 ER 573
Sumpter v Hedges [1898] 1 QB 673  
Bolton v Mahadeva [1972] 2 All ER 1322 
Wilusynski v London Borough of Tower Hamlets [1989] ICR 493, Nicholls LJ holding no "substantial performance" by - and no pay whatsoever for -  a council worker on industrial action who did everything but answer enquiries from councillors.

Notes

References

English unjust enrichment case law
Lord Denning cases
English termination case law
1952 in British law
Court of Appeal (England and Wales) cases
1952 in case law